Swan Song is a 1992 short film directed by Kenneth Branagh and adapted for the screen by Hugh Cruttwell from the one act play of the same name by Anton Chekhov.  It stars John Gielgud as the aging actor Svetlovidov and Richard Briers as the prop-master Nikita.

Awards
Swan Song was nominated for the Academy Award for Best Live Action Short Film.

References

External links
 
 
 

British short films
1992 films
Films directed by Kenneth Branagh
Films produced by David Parfitt
1990s English-language films